The 1994 Grand Prix Passing Shot, also known as the Bordeaux Open, was a men's tennis tournament played on outdoor hard courts at Villa Primrose in Bordeaux, France that was part of the World Series of the 1994 ATP Tour. It was the 17th edition of the tournament and was held from 12 September until 18 September 1994. Second-seeded Wayne Ferreira won the singles title.

Finals

Singles

 Wayne Ferreira defeated  Jeff Tarango 	6–0, 7–5
 It was Ferreira's 3rd singles title of the year and 5th of his career.

Doubles

 Olivier Delaître /  Guy Forget defeated  Diego Nargiso /  Guillaume Raoux 6–2, 2–6, 7–5

References

External links
 ITF tournament edition details

Grand Prix Passing Shot
ATP Bordeaux
Grand Prix Passing Shot
Grand Prix Passing Shot